The 1912 Brown Bears football team represented Brown University as an independent during the 1912 college football season. Led by 11th-year head coach Edward N. Robinson, Brown compiled a record of 6–4.

Schedule

References

Brown
Brown Bears football seasons
Brown Bears football